The following is an alphabetical list of jazz trumpeters:

A

B

C

D

E

F

G

H

I-J

K

L

M

N-O

P

R

S

T-Z

References

External links
Jazz trumpeters of the Swing era
[ All Music: Jazz section]
Down Beat artist profiles and articles

Trumpeters